Sinployea is a genus of small air-breathing land snails, terrestrial pulmonate gastropod mollusks in the family Charopidae.

Species
Species in the genus Sinployea include:
 Sinployea atiensis
 Sinployea andrewi
 Sinployea avanaensis
 Sinployea canalis - extinct
 Sinployea decorticata - extinct
 Sinployea ellicensis
 Sinployea harveyensis - extinct
 Sinployea kusaieana
 Sinployea nissani (Dell, 1955)
 Sinployea otareae - extinct
 Sinployea peasei Solem, 1983 - the type species
 Sinployea pitcairnensis
 Sinployea planospira - extinct
 Sinployea proxima - extinct
 Sinployea pseudovicaria
 Sinployea rotumana
 Sinployea rudis - extinct
 Sinployea tenuicostata - extinct
 Sinployea youngi - extinct

References 

 
Gastropod genera
Fauna of the Cook Islands
Molluscs of Oceania
Charopidae
Taxonomy articles created by Polbot